Heman Allen (February 23, 1779April 7, 1852) was an American lawyer, politician and ambassador from Colchester, Vermont. He served as a U.S. Representative and as America's first United States Minister Plenipotentiary to Chile.

Biography
Allen was born in Poultney, Vermont Republic on February 23, 1779, the son of Heber Allen (1743-1782) and Sarah (Owen) Allen (1748-1787). He attended the common schools, and graduated from Dartmouth College in 1795. He studied law and was admitted to the bar in 1801. He began the practice of law in Colchester, Vermont.

He was town clerk of Colchester from 1807 until 1817. He served as Sheriff of Chittenden County from 1808 until 1810, when he was succeeded by Heman Lowry.  Allen was Chief Justice of the Chittenden County court from 1811 until 1814. He was treasurer of the University of Vermont in 1815.

Allen served as a member of the Vermont House of Representatives from 1812 until 1817. While in the State House he received the appointment of quartermaster of militia, with the rank of Brigadier general. He was elected as a Democratic-Republican candidate to the Fifteenth Congress, serving from March 4, 1817, until his resignation on April 20, 1818. Allen resigned from Congress to become United States Marshal for the district of Vermont on December 14, 1818; he was reappointed on December 24, 1822. Allen was the agent for paying pensioners in 1819.

He was appointed by President James Monroe as America's first United States Minister Plenipotentiary to the new republic of Chile beginning on January 27, 1823. Allen continued in Chile as minister until July 31, 1827.

In 1829, Allen was the unsuccessful gubernatorial candidate of the new Anti-Masonic Party, which supported him though he had not indicated whether he supported the party or its platform. Allen was the unsuccessful National Republican Party candidate in 1831. He served as president of the Burlington branch of the United States Bank from 1830 until the expiration of its charter in 1836. Following the expiration of the bank's charter, he resumed the practice of law in Highgate.

Personal life
When Allen was making arrangements for passage to Chile, he met Elizabeth Hart, the sister-in-law of Isaac Hull. They married before Allen left for his diplomatic mission. She died in 1834, as did their daughter Jeanette.

In 1844, Allen married Eliza Davis Fay. They were the parents of three daughters and a son.

Allen was the nephew of Ira Allen and Ethan Allen. He was the distant cousin of Heman Allen (of Milton).

Death
Allen died on April 7, 1852, in Highgate. He in interred at Greenmount Cemetery in Burlington.

See also
 United States Ambassador to Chile

References

External links 
 Biographical Directory of the United States Congress
 Ancestry.com
 The Political Graveyard
 Govtrack.us
 

|-

1779 births
1852 deaths
People from Poultney (town), Vermont
Democratic-Republican Party members of the United States House of Representatives from Vermont
Vermont Whigs
Ambassadors of the United States to Chile
19th-century American diplomats
Members of the Vermont House of Representatives
Vermont sheriffs
United States Marshals
Dartmouth College alumni
Burials in Vermont